Mike McLenaghen (born June 10, 1954 in Burnaby, British Columbia) is a Canadian former North American Soccer League player and member of the Canadian national soccer team.

Early life
McLenaghen also excelled at lacrosse as a teenager, participating in the Canadian national championship Minto Cup.  He was a member of his local senior soccer club Pegusus F.C. at age 15 and captained Canadian's 1972 National Youth soccer team.

Soccer career
McLenaghen was a member of the Canadian olympic team for the 1976 Summer Olympics and played collegiately in 1977 and 1978  for Simon Fraser University. McLenaghen played four seasons in the NASL, each one on a different team.  He played the summer of 1979 with the Minnesota Kicks, 1980 with the Toronto Blizzard, 1981 for Los Angeles Aztecs, and 1982 with the Edmonton Drillers.

McLenaghen played eight 'A' internationals for Canada, once in 1975 (against Cuba), six times in 1980, and once in 1981.  He did not score any international goals.
He also played for Vancouver Columbus FC in the 1987–88 season.

References

External links
 
 NASL stats
  (archive)
 
 NASL indoor
 Kicks indoor stats
 Blizzard indoor stats

1954 births
Living people
Soccer people from British Columbia
Canadian expatriate sportspeople in the United States
Canadian expatriate soccer players
Canadian lacrosse players
Canada men's youth international soccer players
Canada men's international soccer players
Canadian soccer players
Olympic soccer players of Canada
Footballers at the 1976 Summer Olympics
Edmonton Drillers (1979–1982) players
Expatriate soccer players in the United States
Los Angeles Aztecs players
Minnesota Kicks players
North American Soccer League (1968–1984) players
North American Soccer League (1968–1984) indoor players
Sportspeople from Burnaby
Simon Fraser Clan men's soccer players
Simon Fraser University alumni
Toronto Blizzard (1971–1984) players
Association football midfielders